The 2015 BNP Paribas Primrose Bordeaux was a professional tennis tournament played on clay courts. It was the eighth edition of the tournament which was part of the 2015 ATP Challenger Tour. It took place in Bordeaux, France between 11 and 17 May 2015.

Singles main-draw entrants

Seeds

 1 Rankings are as of May 4, 2015.

Other entrants
The following players received wildcards into the singles main draw:
  Quentin Halys 
  Corentin Moutet
  Lucas Pouille

The following players received entry into the singles main draw as alternate:
  James Duckworth

The following players received entry from the qualifying draw:
  Mathias Bourgue
  Jonathan Eysseric
  Thanasi Kokkinakis 
  Guillaume Rufin

The following players entered as lucky losers:
  Roberto Carballés Baena
  Matteo Viola

Doubles main-draw entrants

Seeds

 1 Rankings are as of May 4, 2015.

Other entrants
The following pairs received wildcards into the doubles main draw:
  Adrien Puget /  Laurent Rochette
  Florent Serra /  Maxime Teixeira
  Quentin Halys /  Tristan Lamasine

The following pair received entry into the doubles main draw with a protected ranking:
  André Ghem /  Ante Pavić

Champions

Singles

 Thanasi Kokkinakis def.  Thiemo de Bakker, 6–4, 1–6, 7–6(7–5)

Doubles

 Thiemo de Bakker /  Robin Haase def.  Lucas Pouille /  Sergiy Stakhovsky, 6–3, 7–5

External links
Official Website

BNP Paribas Primrose Bordeaux
BNP Paribas Primrose Bordeaux
2015 in French tennis